Arne Zetterström (1917 – 7 August 1945) is best known for his research with the breathing mixture hydrox for the Swedish Navy.

Zetterström first described the use of hydrogen as a breathing gas in 1943. From 1943 to 1944, a total of six ocean dives were made utilising this mixture with the deepest to 160 metres (96% hydrogen and 4% oxygen).

On 7 August 1945 Zetterström experienced technical problems diving from HSwMS Belos. His support divers misread his signals and this was followed by a rapid ascent that resulted in fatal decompression sickness and hypoxia.

References

External links
 Photos of Arne Zetterström

 

1917 births
1945 deaths
Underwater diving pioneers
Underwater diving deaths
History of underwater diving